Valter Gazalanas Borges (born 9 November 1988) is a Cape Verdean international footballer who plays professionally as a midfielder.

Career
Borges began his career for Batuque in the Cape Verde, before spending two seasons in Portugal with Santa Clara.

Borges made his international debut in August 2009, receiving a call-up for games against Angola and Malta. Borges earned a third cap in May 2010, in a 0-0 draw with Portugal.

References

1988 births
Living people
People from São Vicente, Cape Verde
Cape Verdean footballers
Cape Verde international footballers
Batuque FC players
C.D. Santa Clara players
CD Alcalá players
Association football midfielders